Naach Govinda Naach is a 1992 Bollywood film directed by S.Subhash, and starring Govinda, Mandakini and Raj Kiran.

Cast

 Govinda
 Mandakini
 Raj Kiran
 Aruna Irani
 Johny Lever

References

External links
 

1992 films
1990s Hindi-language films